Polyporus arcularius is a species of fungus in the genus Polyporus. It is also known as the spring polypore or the scientific name Lentinus arcularius. It has been found on all continents, but has primarily been documented in the United States, Austria, Mexico, Australia, and Japan. It was first documented in 1783 by German naturalist August Batsch under the name Boletus arcularius. It was later renamed to Polyporus arcularius in 1821 by Swedish mycologist Elias Magnus Fries.

Description 
The cap is 1–4 cm (0.39- 1.57 in) in diameter and convex to depressed in shape. It is pale tan to dark brown and has dry scales. The outer area of the cap (margin) has fine hairs. The hymenium has hexagonal pores and is cream to brown in color. The hymenium is decurrent in shape. The stipe is central, bare, scaly, and brownish. The odor is not distinct. It is inedible.The spore color is a cream to white.

References

External links
 
 

arcularius
Fungi described in 1821
Inedible fungi